Siphonostegia is a genus of flowering plants belonging to the family Orobanchaceae.

Its native range is Eastern Mediterranean, China to Russian Far East and Temperate Eastern Asia.

Species
Species:

Siphonostegia chinensis 
Siphonostegia laeta 
Siphonostegia syriaca

References

Orobanchaceae
Orobanchaceae genera